The men's 3000 metres steeplechase at the 2019 Asian Athletics Championships was held on 21 April.

Results

References
Results

3000
Steeplechase at the Asian Athletics Championships